Francis Russell Edward Cornell (November 17, 1821 – May 23, 1881) was an American lawyer, politician, and judge.

Biography
Cornell was born in 1821 in Coventry in Chenango County, New York. He graduated from Union College in 1842 where he had been a member of The Kappa Alpha Society and studied law before being admitted to the bar in 1845. A lawyer in Addison in Steuben County, he represented the 26th District in the New York State Senate from 1852 to 1853.

Cornell moved to Minneapolis, Minnesota in 1854. Cornell served in the Minnesota House of Representatives from District 5 from 1861 to 1862 and in 1865. Cornell was elected Minnesota Attorney General in 1867 and was reelected twice, serving three terms from January 10, 1868, to January 9, 1874. Cornell was elected associate justice of the Minnesota Supreme Court in November 1874 and served from January 11, 1875, until his death on May 23, 1881, in Minneapolis.

Legacy
In an article in Minnesota Law & Politics, Cornell was named as one of the "100 most influential attorneys in state history." He was noted as a pioneering trial lawyer who "established his reputation litigating the land claims that arose out of the opening of the government reservation that occupied most of the west side of the Mississippi River at the time" and as an active abolitionist who successfully argued for the freedom of a slave woman who had been brought north to accompany her owner on a visit.

Notes

1821 births
1881 deaths
Cornell family
Politicians from Minneapolis
People from Addison, New York
People from Coventry, New York
Justices of the Minnesota Supreme Court
Minnesota Attorneys General
New York (state) state senators
Members of the Minnesota House of Representatives
Lawyers from Minneapolis
19th-century American politicians